Michael Jung may refer to:

 Michael Jung (equestrian) (born 1982), German equestrian
 Michael E. Jung (born 1947), Professor of Chemistry at the University of California